Mentuherkhepeshef (mnṯ-ḥr-ḫpš=f; „Montu is with his strong arm”) is an ancient Egyptian name. It may refer to:

 Mentuherkhepeshef (son of Ramesses III), an ancient Egyptian prince of the 20th dynasty
 Mentuherkhepeshef (son of Ramesses IX), an ancient Egyptian prince of the 20th dynasty

Ancient Egyptian given names
Theophoric names